Reinaldo Lizardi (born October 23, 1954) is a retired sprinter from Venezuela, best known for winning the bronze medal in the men's 100 metres at the 1979 South American Championships in Bucaramanga, Colombia.

Achievements

References
 1979 Year Rankings

1954 births
Living people
Venezuelan male sprinters
Place of birth missing (living people)
Athletes (track and field) at the 1983 Pan American Games
Pan American Games competitors for Venezuela
20th-century Venezuelan people
21st-century Venezuelan people